The 1887 Home Nations Championship was the fifth series of the rugby union Home Nations Championship. Six matches were played between 8 January and 12 March. It was contested by England, Ireland, Scotland and Wales.

Scotland won the championship outright for the first time, having shared the title with England in 1886; George Campbell Lindsay scored five tries against Wales, a record which still stands.

Table

Results

Scoring system
The matches for this season were decided on goals scored. A goal was awarded for a successful conversion after a try, for a dropped goal or for a goal from mark. If a game was drawn, any unconverted tries were tallied to give a winner. If there was still no clear winner, the match was declared a draw.

The matches

Wales vs. England

Wales: Harry Bowen (Llanelli), Charles Taylor (Blackheath), Arthur Gould (Newport), Charlie Newman (Newport) capt., Billy Douglas (Cardiff), Jem Evans (Cardiff), Albert Hybart (Cardiff), Bob Gould (Newport), Alexander Bland (Cardiff), William Bowen (Swansea), D Morgan (Swansea), Edward Alexander (Cambridge Uni.), Tom Clapp (Newport), Willie Thomas (Llandovery), Thomas William Lockwood (Newport)

England: Samuel Roberts (Swinton), Richard Lockwood (Dewsbury), Rawson Robertshaw (Bradford), John Le Fleming (Blackheath), Alan Rotherham (Richmond) capt., Fred Bonsor (Bradford), Robert Seddon (Broughton Rangers), WG Clibbon (Richmond), CR Cleveland (Oxford Uni.), GL Jeffery (Blackheath), Lawrie Hickson (Bradford), JH Dewhurst (Cambridge Uni.), Edgar Wilkinson (Bradford), N Spurling (Blackheath), HC Baker (Clifton)

Ireland vs. England

Ireland: Dolway Walkington (NIFC), CR Tillie (Dublin Uni.), DF Rambaut (Dublin Uni.), R Montgomery (Cambridge University), JH McLaughlin (Derry), RG Warren (Lansdowne) capt., Victor Le Fanu (Cambridge University), Thomas Lyle (Dublin Uni.), EJ Walsh (Lansdowne), JS Dick (Queen's College, Cork), R Stevenson (Lisburn), J Macauley (Limerick), J Chambers (Dublin Uni.), J Johnston (Belfast Albion), HJ Neill (NIFC)

England: S Roberts (Swinton), RE Lockwood (Dewsbury), A St L Fagan (United Hospitals), WN Bolton (Blackheath), A Rotherham (Richmond) capt., Mason Scott (Cambridge Uni.), Robert Seddon (Broughton Rangers), WG Clibbon (Richmond), CJB Marriott (Blackheath), GL Jeffery (Blackheath), JL Hickson (Bradford), JH Dewhurst (Cambridge Uni.), AT Kemble (Liverpool), FE Pease (Hartlepool Rovers), A Teggin (Broughton Rangers)

Ireland vs. Scotland

Ireland: JM O'Sullivan (Cork), CR Tillie (Dublin Uni.), DF Rambaut (Dublin Uni.), R Montgomery (Cambridge University), JH McLaughlin (Derry), RG Warren (Lansdowne) capt., CM Moore (Dublin Uni.), Thomas Lyle (Dublin Uni.), EJ Walsh (Lansdowne), JS Dick (Queen's College, Cork), R Stevenson (Lisburn), J Macauley (Limerick), J Chambers (Dublin Uni.), J Johnston (Belfast Albion), HJ Neill (NIFC)

Scotland: WF Holmes (London Scottish), Bill Maclagan (London Scottish), DJ McFarlan (London Scottish), AN Woodrow (Glasgow Acads), PH Don Wauchope (Fettesian-Lorettonians), CE Orr (West of Scotland),  Robert MacMillan (West of Scotland), AT Clay (Edinburgh Acads), J French (Glasgow Acads), TW Irvine (Edinburgh Acads), WC McEwan  (Edinburgh Acads), CW Berry (Edinburgh Wanderers), C Reid (Edinburgh Acads) capt., HT Ker (Glasgow Acads), DS Morton (West of Scotland)

Scotland vs. Wales

Scotland: AWC Cameron (Watsonians), Bill Maclagan (London Scottish), GC Lindsay (London Scottish), AN Woodrow (Glasgow Acads), PH Don Wauchope (Fettesian-Lorettonians), CE Orr (West of Scotland),  Robert MacMillan (West of Scotland), AT Clay (Edinburgh Acads), J French (Glasgow Acads), TW Irvine (Edinburgh Acads), WC McEwan  (Edinburgh Acads), CW Berry (Edinburgh Wanderers), C Reid (Edinburgh Acads) capt., HT Ker (Glasgow Acads), DS Morton (West of Scotland)

Wales: Hugh Hughes (Cardiff), David Gwynn (Swansea), Arthur Gould (Newport), George Bowen (Swansea), Billy Douglas (Cardiff), Jem Evans (Cardiff), William Williams (Cardiff), Bob Gould (Newport) capt., Alexander Bland (Cardiff), William Bowen (Swansea), D Morgan (Swansea), Evan Richards (Swansea), Tom Clapp (Newport), Willie Thomas (Llandovery), Thomas William Lockwood (Newport)

England vs. Scotland

England: HB Tristram (Richmond), RE Lockwood (Dewsbury), R Robertshaw (Bradford), WN Bolton (Blackheath), A Rotherham (Richmond) capt., F Bonsor (Bradford), Robert Seddon (Broughton Rangers), WG Clibbon (Richmond), CR Cleveland (Oxford Uni.), GL Jeffery (Blackheath), JL Hickson (Bradford), JH Dewhurst (Cambridge Uni.), E Wilkinson (Bradford), HH Springman (Liverpool), A Teggin (Broughton Rangers)

Scotland: WF Holmes (London Scottish), Bill Maclagan (London Scottish), GC Lindsay (London Scottish), AN Woodrow (Glasgow Acads), PH Don Wauchope (Fettesian-Lorettonians), CE Orr (West of Scotland),  Robert MacMillan (West of Scotland), AT Clay (Edinburgh Acads), J French (Glasgow Acads), TW Irvine (Edinburgh Acads), WC McEwan  (Edinburgh Acads), CW Berry (Edinburgh Wanderers), C Reid (Edinburgh Acads) capt., HT Ker (Glasgow Acads), DS Morton (West of Scotland)

Wales vs. Ireland

Wales: Samuel Clark (Neath), Charles Taylor (Blackheath), Arthur Gould (Newport), George Bowen (Swansea), John Goulstone Lewis (Llanelli), William Stadden (Cardiff), William Williams (Cardiff), Evan Roberts (Llanelli), Alexander Bland (Cardiff), William Bowen (Swansea), D Morgan (Swansea), Edward Alexander (Cambridge Uni.), Tom Clapp (Newport) capt., William Towers (Swansea), Thomas William Lockwood (Newport)

Ireland: Dolway Walkington (NIFC), Maxwell Carpendale (Monkstown), DF Rambaut (Dublin Uni.), R Montgomery (Cambridge University), PJ O'Connor (Lansdowne), RG Warren (Lansdowne) capt., Victor Le Fanu (Cambridge University), T Taggart (Dublin Uni.), EJ Walsh (Lansdowne), JS Dick (Queen's College, Cork), R Stevenson (Lisburn), W Davison (Belfast Academy), J Chambers (Dublin Uni.), J Johnston (Belfast Albion), HJ Neill (NIFC)

External links

Bibliography

References

1886-87
1886–87 in British rugby union
1886–87 in English rugby union
rugby union
rugby union
Home Nations Championship
1886–87 in Scottish rugby union